Valia may refer to:

Given name
 Valia Venitshaya, British actress of the silent era
 Valia Kakouti (born 1981), Miss Star Hellas 2004
 Valia Barak (born 1969), Peruvian journalist and television presenter
 Valia Valentinoff (1919-2006), actor and choreographer

Other uses
 Valia (wasp), a genus of insects in the family Diapriidae
 Valia College, an education institute in Mumbai, India
 Walia, Indian surname

Unisex given names